Kargabazar may refer to:
 Haykashen, Armenia
 Qarğabazar, Azerbaijan